Wan Man is a small island in Kuala Terengganu, Terengganu, Malaysia.   It is located off the east coast of that state's mainland where the Terengganu River meets the South China Sea.

Pulau Wan Man is the home of Malaysia's Islamic Heritage Park which was opened in February 2008.  The park includes Crystal Mosque along the island's northeastern shore, as well as scaled replicas of various landmarks around the world such as India's Taj Mahal and Jerusalem's Dome of the Rock.

Prior to construction of the Islamic Heritage Park, the island had no human inhabitants, but was home to reptiles, with palm forest and thick undergrowth.

See also
List of islands of Malaysia

References

Islands of Terengganu
Kuala Terengganu